The 1898 North Carolina Tar Heels football team represented the University of North Carolina in the 1898 college football season. They played nine games with a final record of 9–0. The team captain for the 1898 season was Frank O. Rogers. The team claims a Southern championship.

Schedule

Season summary

Guilford
The season opened with an 18–0  defeat of the Guilford Quakers. Charles Baskerville was umpire.

The starting lineup was Tate (left end), Shull (left tackle), Miller (left guard), Cunningham (center), Cromartie (right guard), Bennett (Right tackle), Klotz (right end), Rogers (quarterback), Howell (left halfback), Gregory (right halfback), Graves (fullback).

North Carolina A&M
In the second week of play, the Tar Heels defeated the in-state rival North Carolina A&M 34–0.

Greensboro A. A.
Against the Greensboro Athletic Association, UNC won 11–0.

Oak Ridge
Oak Ridge was beaten 11–0.

V. P. I.
Touchdowns were made by Bennett, Gregory, Copeland, Shull, and Howell in a 28–6 win over V. P. I.

Davidson
North Carolina beat Davidson 11–0.

Georgia
In Macon, the Tar Heels blew out the Georgia Bulldogs 53–0. Tick Tichenor wrote "Such a crush defeat as Georgia sustained at the hands of North Carolina today is almost unparalleled in football".

The starting lineup was Klotz (left end), Shull (left tackle), Cromartie (left guard), Cunningham (center), Phifer (right guard), Bennett (Right tackle), Gregoy (right end), Rodgers (quarterback), Austin (left halfback), McRae (right halfback), Graves (fullback).

Auburn
The Tar Heels won over John Heisman's Auburn Tigers 29–0.

Virginia
UNC beat rival Virginia, 6–2, for its first win since the first year of the South's Oldest Rivalry. The safety was made just as time called, and Howell scored for UNC.

Players

Line

Backfield

References

North Carolina
North Carolina Tar Heels football seasons
College football undefeated seasons
North Carolina Tar Heels football